Hélène Bons (10 August 1903 – 26 January 1999) was a French athlete. She competed in the women's high jump at the 1928 Summer Olympics.

References

1903 births
1999 deaths
Athletes (track and field) at the 1928 Summer Olympics
French female high jumpers
Olympic athletes of France
Place of birth missing
Women's World Games medalists
20th-century French women